Susan Andrea Bernal López (born 1982) is a Colombian materials scientist who is Professor of Structural Materials at the University of Leeds. Her research considers design, development and characterisation of novel cements. She was awarded the 2020 Institute of Materials, Minerals and Mining Rosenhain Medal and Prize.

Early life and education 
Bernal was born in Bogotá, Colombia. She was an undergraduate and postgraduate student at the University of Valle, where she worked on alkali-activated cements (so-called geopolymers). Specifically, her doctoral research considered the carbonation of concretes that are based on alkaline activated slag. She worked with Ruby Mejía de Gutiérrez, a Professor of Materials Science, on a number of papers and they registered a patent together. During her doctorate she carried out two internships, one supported by the United States Department of Energy to work at the Argonne National Laboratory, and one at the University of Melbourne. After graduating, Bernal moved to Aarhus University, where she spent a year as a postdoctoral fellow at the iNANO Instrument Center of the University of Aarhus (INANO).

Research and career 
In 2010, Bernal moved to the University of Melbourne, where she became interested in geopolymers. Bernal was appointed as research fellow at the University of Sheffield in 2012, where she started working on alternatives to cement and concrete. Concrete is one of the world's most popular building materials, and contributes to five to eight percent of global carbon dioxide emissions. She was made a lecturer in 2015. 

In 2018, Bernal moved to the University of Leeds, where she continued to develop novel cements and concretes that are more sustainable and durable. In particular, she made use of natural clays and industrial waste. She joined the University of Leeds as an academic fellow and she became a professor there in 2019.

Awards and recognitions 
 2005 Colombian Innovation Agency (COLCIENCIAS) Scholarship
 2008 Walter Mangold Trust Fund scholarship 
 2016 University of Valle Distinguished Graduate Award
 2016 RILEM (Réunion Internationale des Laboratoires et Experts des Matériaux, systèmes de construction et ouvrages) Gustavo Colonnetti medal
 2019 Institution of Civil Engineers Advances in Cement Research Prize
 2020 IOM3 Rosenhain Medal and Prize
 2021 Materials Research Society Kavli Early Career Lectureship in Materials Science
 2022 RILEM Robert L'Hermite Medal

Selected publications

References 

Colombian scientists
Colombian women scientists
University of Valle alumni
Academics of the University of Leeds
1982 births
Living people
People from Bogotá